Fairport is an unincorporated community along the Mississippi River and Iowa Highway 22 in Muscatine County, Iowa, United States.

Demographics

History
Fairport, originally called Salem, was platted in 1839.

Fairport was once a stop along the Chicago, Rock Island and Pacific Railroad and along the Milwaukee Road.

Education
Muscatine Community School District operates public schools serving the community. Muscatine High School is the district's high school.

References

Unincorporated communities in Muscatine County, Iowa
Unincorporated communities in Iowa
Muscatine, Iowa micropolitan area
1839 establishments in Iowa Territory